Princes' School is a school in Riyadh, Saudi Arabia.

History

The Princes' School was established by King Ibn Saud specifically to ensure a high level of education for members of the House of Saud and sons of other foremost Saudis. In 1356 H (corresponding to 1937), the school was reorganised and reopened on the second floor of Deera Palace.

Early in the Ibn Saud newly established country, the Council of Senior Scholars or ulema thought education should only involve studying the Qur'an and Sharia law. The school was located in Ibn Saud’s palace and the imam of the Grand Mosque of Mecca taught there. The school was only conducted within the Royal court.

Alumni
 Salman bin Abdulaziz Al Saud, King of Saudi Arabia
 Fahd bin Abdulaziz Al Saud, King of Saudi Arabia
 Ahmed bin Abdulaziz Al Saud
 Faisal bin Turki I bin Abdulaziz Al Saud
 Fawwaz bin Abdulaziz Al Saud 
 Nayef bin Abdulaziz Al Saud
 Sattam bin Abdulaziz Al Saud
 Turki II bin Abdulaziz Al Saud

See also
 Education in Saudi Arabia

References

1937 establishments in Saudi Arabia
Educational institutions established in 1937
Schools in Riyadh
House of Saud